This is a list of diseases starting with the letter "M".

Ma

Mac
 Mac Dermot Patton Williams syndrome
 Mac Dermot Winter syndrome

Maci–Macr
 Macias–Flores–Garcia–Cruz–Rivera syndrome
 Mackay–Shek–Carr syndrome
 Macleod–Fraser syndrome
 Macrocephaly cutis marmorata telangiectatica
 Macrocephaly dominant type
 Macrocephaly mental retardation facial dysmorphism
 Macrocephaly mesodermal hamartoma spectrum
 Macrocephaly mesomelic arms talipes
 Macrocephaly pigmentation large hands feet
 Macrocephaly short stature paraplegia
 Macrodactyly of the foot
 Macrodactyly of the hand
 Macroepiphyseal dysplasia Mcalister Coe type
 Macroglobulinemia
 Macroglossia dominant
 Macroglossia exomphalos gigantism
 Macrogyria pseudobulbar palsy
 Macrophagic myofasciitis
 Macrosomia developmental delay dysmorphism
 Macrosomia microphthalmia cleft palate
 Macrothrombocytopenia progressive deafness
 Macrothrombocytopenia with leukocyte inclusions

Macu
 Macular corneal dystrophy
 Macular degeneration
 Macular degeneration juvenile
 Macular degeneration, age-related
 Macular degeneration, polymorphic
 Macular dystrophy, vitelliform
 Macules hereditary congenital hypopigmented and hyperpigmented

Mad–Mak
 Mad cow disease
 Madelung's disease
 Madokoro–Ohdo–Sonoda syndrome
 Maffucci syndrome
 Maghazaji syndrome
 Magnesium defect in renal tubular transport of
 Magnesium wasting renal
 Major depressive disorder

Mal
 Mal de debarquement

Mala–Mall
 Malakoplakia
 Malaria
 Male pseudohermaphroditism due to 17-beta-hydroxysteroid dehydrogenase deficiency
 Male pseudohermaphroditism due to 5-alpha-reductase 2 deficiency
 Male pseudohermaphroditism due to defective LH molecule
 Malformations in neuronal migration
 Malignant astrocytoma
 Malignant fibrous histiocytoma
 Malignant germ cell tumor
 Malignant hyperthermia arthrogryposis torticollis
 Malignant hyperthermia
 Malignant hyperthermia susceptibility type 1
 Malignant hyperthermia susceptibility type 2
 Malignant hyperthermia susceptibility type 3
 Malignant hyperthermia susceptibility type 4
 Malignant hyperthermia susceptibility type 5
 Malignant hyperthermia susceptibility type 6
 Malignant mesenchymal tumor
 Malignant mixed Müllerian tumor
 Malignant paroxysmal ventricular tachycardia
 Mallory–Weiss syndrome

Malo–Malp
 Malonic aciduria
 Malonyl-CoA decarboxylase deficiency
 Malouf syndrome
 Malpuech facial clefting syndrome

Man
 Mandibuloacral dysplasia
 Mandibulofacial dysostosis deafness postaxial polydactyly
 Manic Depression, Bipolar
 Manic-depressive psychosis, genetic types
 Mannosidosis
 Manouvrier syndrome
 Mansonelliasis
 Mantle cell lymphoma

Mar

Mara–Marg
 Marashi–Gorlin syndrome
 Marburg fever
 Marchiafava–Bignami disease
 Marchiafava–Micheli disease
 Marcus Gunn phenomenon
 Marden–Walker-like syndrome
 Marden–Walker syndrome
 Marek disease
 Marfan syndrome
 Marfan Syndrome type II
 Marfan Syndrome type III
 Marfan Syndrome type IV
 Marfan Syndrome type V
 Marfan-like syndrome, Boileau type
 Marfan-like syndrome
 Marfanoid craniosynostosis syndrome
 Marfanoid hypermobility
 Marfanoid mental retardation syndrome autosomal
 Marginal glioneuronal heterotopia

Mari–Mart
 Marie type ataxia
 Marie–Unna congenital hypotrichosis
 Marinesco–Sjögren like syndrome
 Marinesco–Sjögren syndrome
 Marion–Mayers syndrome
 Markel–Vikkula–Mulliken syndrome
 Marles–Greenberg–Persaud syndrome
 Marker chromosome 15 syndrome
 Maroteaux–Cohen–Solal–Bonaventure syndrome
 Maroteaux–Fonfria syndrome
 Maroteaux–Le Merrer–Bensahel syndrome
 Maroteaux–Stanescu–Cousin syndrome
 Maroteaux–Verloes–Stanescu syndrome
 Maroteaux–Lamy syndrome
 Marphanoid syndrome type De Silva
 Marsden–Nyhan–Sakati syndrome
 Marsden syndrome
 Marshall syndrome
 Marshall–Smith syndrome
 Martinez–Monasterio–Pinheiro syndrome
 Martsolf–Reed–Hunter syndrome
 Martsolf syndrome

Mas–May
 MASA syndrome
 Mass psychogenic illness
 MASS syndrome
 Massa–Casaer–Ceulemans syndrome
 Mast cell disease
 Mastocytosis, short stature, hearing loss
 Mastocytosis
 Mastoiditis
 Mastroiacovo–De Rosa–Satta syndrome
 Mastroiacovo–Gambi–Segni syndrome
 MAT deficiency
 Maternal hyperphenylalaninemia
 Maternally inherited diabetes and deafness
 Mathieu–De Broca–Bony syndrome
 Matsoukas–Liarikos–Giannika syndrome
 Matthew–Wood syndrome
 Maturity onset diabetes of the young
 Maumenee syndrome
 Maxillary double lip
 Maxillofacial dysostosis
 Maxillonasal dysplasia, Binder type
 Mayer–Rokitanski–Kuster syndrome
 May–Hegglin anomaly

Mc
 McAlister–Crane syndrome
 McArdle disease
 McCallum–Macadam–Johnston syndrome
 McCune–Albright syndrome
 McDonough syndrome
 McDowall syndrome
 McGillivray syndrome
 McKusick–Kaufman syndrome
 McKusick type metaphyseal chondrodysplasia
 McLain–Debakian syndrome
 McPherson–Clemens syndrome
 McPherson–Robertson–Cammarano syndrome

Me

Mea–Med
 Meacham–Winn–Culler syndrome
 Meadows syndrome, names for:
 Munchausen syndrome by proxy
 Peripartum cardiomyopathy
 Measles
 Meckel like syndrome
 Meckel syndrome
 Medeira Dennis Donnai syndrome
 Median cleft lip corpus callosum lipoma skin polyps
 Median nodule of the upper lip
 Mediastinal endodermal sinus tumors
 Mediastinal syndrome
 Mediterranean fever
 Medium-chain Acyl-CoA dehydrogenase deficiency
 Medrano Roldan syndrome
 Medullary cystic disease
 Medullary thyroid carcinoma
 Medulloblastoma

Meg–Mei
 Megacystis microcolon intestinal hypoperistalsis syndrome
 Megaduodenum
 Mega-epiphyseal dwarfism
 Megalencephalic leukodystrophy
 Megalencephaly-cystic leukodystrophy
 Megaloblastic anemia
 Megalocornea mental retardation syndrome
 Megalocytic interstitial nephritis
 Mehes syndrome
 Mehta–Lewis–Patton syndrome
 Meier–Blumberg–Imahorn syndrome
 Meier–Rotschild syndrome
 Meige syndrome
 Meigel disease
 Meinecke–Pepper syndrome
 Meinecke syndrome

Mel–Mem
 Melanoma type 1
 Melanoma type 2
 Melanoma, familial
 Melanoma, malignant
 Melanoma-astrocytoma syndrome
 Melanosis neurocutaneous
 MELAS
 Meleda disease
 Melhem–Fahl syndrome
 Melioidosis
 Melkersson–Rosenthal syndrome
 Melnick–Needles osteodysplasty
 Melnick–Needles syndrome
 Membranoproliferative glomerulonephritis (type II)

Men

Mend–Meno
 Mendelian susceptibility to atypical mycobacteria
 Menetrier's disease
 Mengel–Konigsmark syndrome
 Ménière's disease
 Meningeal angiomatosis cleft hypoplastic left heart
 Meningioma 1
 Meningioma
 Meningitis, meningococcal
 Meningitis
 Meningocele
 Meningococcemia
 Meningoencephalocele
 Meningoencephalocele-arthrogryposis-hypoplastic thumb
 Meningomyelocele

Ment

Menta

Mental
Mental d – Mental m
 Mental deficiency-epilepsy-endocrine disorders
 Mental mixed retardation deafness clubbed digits
Mental r
 Mental retardation
Mental retardation a – Mental retardation m
 Mental retardation anophthalmia craniosynostosis
 Mental retardation arachnodactyly hypotonia telangiectasia
 Mental retardation athetosis microphthalmia
 Mental retardation blepharophimosis obesity web neck
 Mental retardation Buenos Aires type
 Mental retardation cataracts calcified pinnae myopathy
 Mental retardation coloboma slimness
 Mental retardation contractural arachnodactyly
 Mental retardation dysmorphism hypogonadism diabetes
 Mental retardation epilepsy bulbous nose
 Mental retardation epilepsy
 Mental retardation gynecomastia obesity X linked
 Mental retardation hip luxation G6PD variant
 Mental retardation hypocupremia hypobetalipoproteinemia
 Mental retardation hypotonia skin hyperpigmentation
 Mental retardation macrocephaly coarse facies hypotonia
 Mental retardation microcephaly phalangeal facial
 Mental retardation microcephaly unusual facies
 Mental retardation Mietens–Weber type
 Mental retardation multiple nevi
 Mental retardation myopathy short stature endocrine defect
 Mental retardation nasal hypoplasia obesity genital hypoplasia
Mental retardation n – Mental retardation s
 Mental retardation nasal papillomata
 Mental retardation osteosclerosis
 Mental retardation progressive spasticity
 Mental retardation psychosis macroorchidism
 Mental retardation short broad thumbs
 Mental retardation short stature absent phalanges
 Mental retardation short stature Bombay phenotype
 Mental retardation short stature cleft palate unusual facies
 Mental retardation short stature deafness genital
 Mental retardation short stature hand contractures genital anomalies
 Mental retardation short stature heart and skeletal anomalies
 Mental retardation short stature hypertelorism
 Mental retardation short stature microcephaly eye
 Mental retardation short stature ocular and articular anomalies
 Mental retardation short stature scoliosis
 Mental retardation short stature unusual facies
 Mental retardation short stature wedge shaped epiphyses
 Mental retardation skeletal dysplasia abducens palsy
 Mental retardation Smith–Fineman–Myers type
 Mental retardation spasticity ectrodactyly
Mental retardation u – Mental retardation x
 Mental retardation unusual facies Ampola type
 Mental retardation unusual facies Davis–Lafer type
 Mental retardation unusual facies talipes hand anomalies
 Mental retardation unusual facies
 Mental retardation Wolff type
 Mental retardation X linked Atkin type
 Mental retardation X linked borderline Maoa metabolism anomaly
 Mental retardation X linked Brunner type
 Mental retardation X linked dysmorphism
 Mental retardation X linked dystonia dysarthria
 Mental retardation X linked severe Gustavson type
 Mental retardation X linked short stature obesity
 Mental retardation X linked Tranebjaerg type seizures psoriasis
 Mental retardation, unexplained
 Mental retardation, X linked, Marfanoid habitus
 Mental retardation, X linked, nonspecific
 Mental retardation, X-linked 14
 Mental retardation-polydactyly-uncombable hair

Mer–Mes
 Mercury poisoning (Mercurialism)
 Meretoja syndrome
 Merkle tumors
 Merlob–Grunebaum–Reisner syndrome
 Merlob syndrome
 Mesangial sclerosis, diffuse
 Mesenteric ischemia
 Mesenteric panniculitis
 Mesodermal defects lower type
 Mesomelia synostoses
 Mesomelia
 Mesomelic dwarfism cleft palate camptodactyly
 Mesomelic dwarfism Langer type
 Mesomelic dwarfism Nievergelt type
 Mesomelic dwarfism Reinhardt–Pfeiffer type
 Mesomelic dysplasia skin dimples
 Mesomelic dysplasia Thai type
 Mesomelic syndrome Pfeiffer type
 Mesothelioma

Met

Meta
 Metabolic acidosis
 Metabolic disorder
 Metabolic syndrome X
 Metacarpals 4 and 5 fusion
 Metachondromatosis
 Metageria
 Metaphyseal anadysplasia
 Metaphyseal chondrodysplasia Schmid type
 Metaphyseal chondrodysplasia Spahr type
 Metaphyseal chondrodysplasia, others
 Metaphyseal dysostosis mental retardation conductive deafness
 Metaphyseal dysplasia maxillary hypoplasia brachydactyly
 Metaphyseal dysplasia Pyle type
 Metastatic Insulinoma
 Metatarsus adductus
 Metatrophic dysplasia
 Metatropic dwarfism

Meth
 Methimazole antenatal infection
 Methionine adenosyltransferase deficiency
 Methyl mercury antenatal infection
 Methylcobalamin deficiency cbl G type
 Methylcobalamin deficiency, cbl E complementation type
 Methylenetetrahydrofolate reductase deficiency
 Methylmalonic acidemia with homocystinuria
 Methylmalonic acidemia
 Methylmalonic aciduria microcephaly cataract
 Methylmalonicacidemia with homocystinuria, cbl D
 Methylmalonicaciduria with homocystinuria, cbl F
 Methylmalonicaciduria, vitamin B12 unresponsive, mut-0
 Methylmalonyl-Coenzyme A mutase deficiency

Mev–Mey
 Mevalonate kinase deficiency
 Mevalonicaciduria
 Meyenburg–Altherr–Uehlinger syndrome

Mi

Mib
 Mibies syndrome

Mic

Mich–Mick
 Michelin tire baby syndrome
 Michels Caskey syndrome
 Michels syndrome
 Mickleson syndrome

Micr

Mircre
 Micrencephaly corpus callosum agenesis
 Micrencephaly olivopontocerebellar hypoplasia

Micro
 Micro syndrome

Microb
 Microbrachycephaly ptosis cleft lip

Microc
Microcephalic
 Microcephalic osteodysplastic primordial dwarfism
 Microcephalic primordial dwarfism Toriello type
 Microcephalic primordial dwarfism
Microcephaly
 Microcephaly
Microcephaly a – Microcephaly l
 Microcephaly albinism digital anomalies syndrome
 Microcephaly autosomal dominant
 Microcephaly brachydactyly kyphoscoliosis
 Microcephaly brain defect spasticity hypernatremia
 Microcephaly cardiac defect lung malsegmentation
 Microcephaly cardiomyopathy
 Microcephaly cervical spine fusion anomalies
 Microcephaly chorioretinopathy recessive form
 Microcephaly cleft palate autosomal dominant
 Microcephaly deafness syndrome
 Microcephaly developmental delay pancytopenia
 Microcephaly facial clefting preaxial polydactyly
 Microcephaly glomerulonephritis Marfanoid habitus
 Microcephaly hiatus hernia nephrotic syndrome
 Microcephaly hypergonadotropic hypogonadism short stature
 Microcephaly immunodeficiency lymphoreticuloma
 Microcephaly intracranial calcification
 Microcephaly lymphoedema chorioretinal dysplasia
 Microcephaly lymphoedema syndrome
Microcephaly m – Microcephaly w
 Microcephaly mental retardation retinopathy
 Microcephaly mental retardation spasticity epilepsy
 Microcephaly mesobrachyphalangy tracheoesophageal fistula syndrome
 Microcephaly microcornea syndrome Seemanova type
 Microcephaly micropenis convulsions
 Microcephaly microphthalmos blindness
 Microcephaly nonsyndromal
 Microcephaly pontocerebellar hypoplasia dyskinesia
 Microcephaly seizures mental retardation heart disorders
 Microcephaly sparse hair mental retardation seizures
 Microcephaly syndactyly brachymesophalangy
 Microcephaly with chorioretinopathy, autosomal dominant form
 Microcephaly with normal intelligence, immunodeficiency
 Microcephaly with spastic q­riplegia
 Microcephaly, holoprosencephaly, and intrauterine growth retardation
 Microcephaly, primary autosomal recessive
Microco
 Microcoria, congenital
 Microcornea correctopia macular hypoplasia
 Microcornea glaucoma absent frontal sinuses

Microd – Microv
 Microdontia hypodontia short stature
 Microencephaly
 Microgastria limb reduction defect
 Microgastria short stature diabetes
 Microinfarct
 Micromelic dwarfism Fryns type
 Micromelic dysplasia dislocation of radius
 Microphtalmos bilateral colobomatous orbital cyst
 Microphthalmia
 Microphthalmia, Lentz type
 Microphthalmia camptodactyly mental retardation
 Microphthalmia cataract
 Microphthalmia diaphragmatic hernia Fallot
 Microphthalmia mental deficiency
 Microphthalmia microtia fetal akinesia
 Microphthalmia with limb anomalies
 Microphthalmos, microcornea, and sclerocornea
 Microscopic polyangiitis
 Microsomia hemifacial radial defects
 Microspherophakia metaphyseal dysplasia
 Microsporidiosis
 Microtia, meatal atresia and conductive deafness
 Microvillus inclusion disease

Micu
 Miculicz syndrome

Mid–Mir
 MIDAS syndrome
 Midline cleft of lower lip
 Midline defects autosomal type
 Midline defects recessive type
 Midline developmental field defects
 Midline field defects
 Midline lethal granuloma
 Mietens syndrome
 Mievis–Verellen–Dumoulin syndrome
 Migraine
 Mikulicz syndrome
 Mild cognitive impairment
 Miller Fisher syndrome
 Miller–Dieker syndrome
 Milner–Khallouf–Gibson syndrome
 MILS syndrome
 Minamata disease
 Minkowski–Chauffard syndrome
 Minoxidil antenatal infection
 Miosis, congenital
 Mirhosseini–Holmes–Walton syndrome
 Mirror hands feet nasal defects
 Mirror polydactyly segmentation and limbs defects

Mis–Mix
 Mitochondrial cytopathy (generic term)
 Mitochondrial diseases of nuclear origin
 Mitochondrial diseases, clinically undefinite
 Mitochondrial disease
 Mitochondrial encephalomyopathy aminoacidopathy
 Mitochondrial genetic disorders
 Mitochondrial myopathy lactic acidosis
 Mitochondrial myopathy-encephalopathy-lactic acidosis
 Mitochondrial PEPCK deficiency
 Mitochondrial trifunctional protein deficiency
 Mitral atresia
 Mitral regurgitation deafness skeletal anomalies
 Mitral valve prolapse, familial, autosomal dominant
 Mitral valve prolapse, familial, X linked
 Mitral valve prolapse
 Miura syndrome
 Mixed connective tissue disease
 Mixed Müllerian tumor
 Mixed receptive-expressive language disorder
 Mixed sclerosing bone dystrophy

Ml–Mn
 MLS syndrome
 MMEP syndrome
 MMT syndrome
 MN1
 MNGIE syndrome

Mo

Mob–Mom
 Möbius syndrome
 MODY syndrome
 Möbius axonal neuropathy hypogonadism
 Moerman Van den berghe Fryns syndrome
 Moeschler–Clarren syndrome
 Mohr syndrome
 Mohr–Tranebjærg syndrome
 Mollica–Pavone–Antener syndrome
 Molluscum contagiosum
 Moloney syndrome
 Molybdenum cofactor deficiency
 MOMO syndrome

Mon–Moo
 Mondini dysplasia
 Mondor's disease
 Monge's disease
 Monilethrix
 Monoamine oxidase A deficiency
 Monoclonal gammopathy of undetermined significance
 Monodactyly tetramelic
 Mononen–Karnes–Senac syndrome
 Mononeuritis multiplex
 Monosomy 8q12 21
 Monosomy 8q21 q22
 Monosomy X
 Montefiore syndrome
 Moore–Federman syndrome
 Moore–Smith–Weaver syndrome

Mor–Moy
 Morel's ear
 Moreno–Zachai–Kaufman syndrome
 Morgani–Turner–Albright syndrome
 Morillo–Cucci–Passarge syndrome
 Morphea scleroderma
 Morphea, generalized
 Morquio disease, type A
 Morquio disease, type B
 Morquio syndrome
 Morrison–Young syndrome
 Morse–Rawnsley–Sargent syndrome
 Motor neuron disease
 Motor neuro-ophthalmic disorders
 Motor neuropathy peripheral dysautonomia
 Motor neuropathy
 Motor sensory neuropathy type 1 aplasia cutis congenita
 Mounier-Kuhn syndrome
 Mount–Reback syndrome
 Mousa Al din Al Nassar syndrome
 Moyamoya disease

Mp–Mt
 MPO deficiency
 MPS III-A
 MPS III-B
 MPS III-C
 MPS III-D
 MPS VI
 MRKH Syndrome (Müllerian agenesis)
 MSBD syndrome
 MTHFR deficiency

Mu

Muc–Mue
 Mucha–Habermann disease
 Muckle–Wells syndrome
 Mucoepithelial dysplasia
 Mucolipidosis type 1
 Mucolipidosis type 3
 Mucolipidosis type 4
 Mucopolysaccharidosis type 3
 Mucopolysaccharidosis type 4
 Mucopolysaccharidosis type I Hurler syndrome
 Mucopolysaccharidosis type I Hurler/Scheie syndrome
 Mucopolysaccharidosis type I Scheie syndrome
 Mucopolysaccharidosis type II Hunter syndrome- mild form
 Mucopolysaccharidosis type II Hunter syndrome- severe form
 Mucopolysaccharidosis type IV-A Morquio syndrome
 Mucopolysaccharidosis type IV-B
 Mucopolysaccharidosis type V
 Mucopolysaccharidosis type VI Maroteaux-Lamy - severe, intermediate
 Mucopolysaccharidosis type VII Sly syndrome
 Mucopolysaccharidosis
 Mucormycosis
 Mucosulfatidosis
 Muenke syndrome

Mul

Muli–Mull
 Mulibrey nanism
 Müller–Barth–Menger syndrome
 Müllerian agenesis
 Müllerian aplasia
 Müllerian derivatives lymphangiectasia polydactyly
 Müllerian derivatives, persistent
 Müllerian duct abnormalities galactosemia
 Mulliez–Roux–Loterman syndrome

Mult

Multi

Multic–Multin
 Multicentric osteolysis nephropathy
 Multicentric reticulohistiocytosis
 Multifocal heterotopia
 Multifocal motor neuropathy
 Multifocal ventricular premature beats
 Multi-infarct dementia
 Multinodular goiter cystic kidney polydactyly

Multip
Multiple a – Multiple p
 Multiple acyl-CoA deficiency
 Multiple carboxylase deficiency, biotin responsive
 Multiple carboxylase deficiency, late onset
 Multiple carboxylase deficiency, propionic acidemia
 Multiple chemical sensitivity
 Multiple congenital anomalies mental retardation, growth failure and cleft lip palate
 Multiple congenital contractures
 Multiple contracture syndrome Finnish type
 Multiple endocrine neoplasia type 1
 Multiple endocrine neoplasia, type 2
 Multiple fibrofolliculoma familial
 Multiple hereditary exostoses
 Multiple joint dislocations metaphyseal dysplasia
 Multiple myeloma
 Multiple organ failure
 Multiple pterygium syndrome lethal type
 Multiple pterygium syndrome
Multiple s – Multiple v
 Multiple sclerosis ichthyosis factor VIII deficiency
 Multiple sclerosis
 Multiple subcutaneous angiolipomas
 Multiple sulfatase deficiency
 Multiple synostoses syndrome 1
 Multiple system atrophy
 Multiple vertebral anomalies unusual facies

Mum–Mut
 Mumps
 Münchausen syndrome
 Münchausen syndrome by proxy
 Muscle-eye-brain syndrome
 Muscular atrophy ataxia retinitis pigmentosa diabetes mellitus
 Muscular dystrophy congenital infantile cataract hypogonadism
 Muscular dystrophy congenital, merosin negative
 Muscular dystrophy, facioscapulohumeral
 Muscular dystrophy Hutterite type
 Muscular dystrophy limb girdle type 2A, Erb type
 Muscular dystrophy limb-girdle autosomal dominant
 Muscular dystrophy limb-girdle type 2B, Myoshi type
 Muscular dystrophy limb-girdle with beta-sarcoglycan deficiency
 Muscular dystrophy limb-girdle with delta-sarcoglyan deficiency
 Muscular dystrophy white matter spongiosis
 Muscular dystrophy, congenital, merosin-positive
 Muscular dystrophy, Duchenne and Becker type
 Muscular dystrophy
 Muscular fibrosis multifocal obstructed vessels
 Muscular phosphorylase kinase deficiency
 Mutations in estradiol receptor

My

Mya–Myc
 Myalgia eosinophilia associated with tryptophan
 Myalgic encephalomyelitis
 Myasthenia gravis congenital
 Myasthenia gravis
 Myasthenia, familial
 Mycobacterium avium complex infection
 Mycoplasmal pneumonia
 Mycosis fungoides lymphoma
 Mycosis fungoides, familial
 Mycosis fungoides
 Mycositis fungoides

Mye–Myi
 Myelinopathy
 Myelitis
 Myelocerebellar disorder
 Myelodysplasia
 Myelodysplastic syndromes
 Myelofibrosis, idiopathic
 Myelofibrosis
 Myelofibrosis-osteosclerosis
 Myeloid splenomegaly
 Myeloperoxidase deficiency
 Myhre–Ruvalcaba–Graham syndrome
 Myhre–Ruvalcaba–Kelley syndrome
 Myhre–School syndrome
 Myhre syndrome
 Myiasis

Myo

Myoa–Myon
 Myoadenylate deaminase deficiency
 Myocarditis
 Myocardium disorder
 Myoclonic dystonia
 Myoclonic epilepsy
 Myoclonic epilepsy with ragged red fibres (MERRF syndrome)
 Myoclonic progressive familial epilepsy
 Myoclonus ataxia
 Myoclonus cerebellar ataxia deafness
 Myoclonus epilepsy partial seizure
 Myoclonus hereditary progressive distal muscular atrophy
 Myoclonus progressive epilepsy of Unverricht and Lundborg
 Myoclonus
 Myofibrillar lysis
 Myofibroblastic tumors
 Myoglobinuria dominant form
 Myoglobinuria recurrent
 Myoglobinuria
 Myoneurogastrointestinal encephalopathy syndrome

Myop
 Myopathy and diabetes mellitus
 Myopathy cataract hypogonadism
 Myopathy congenital multicore with external ophthalmoplegia
 Myopathy growth and mental retardation hypospadias
 Myopathy Hutterite type
 Myopathy mitochondrial cataract
 Myopathy Moebius Robin syndrome
 Myopathy ophthalmoplegia hypoacousia areflexia
 Myopathy tubular aggregates
 Myopathy with lactic acidosis and sideroblastic anemia
 Myopathy with lysis of myofibrils
 Myopathy, centronuclear
 Myopathy, desmin storage
 Myopathy, McArdle type
 Myopathy, myotubular
 Myopathy, X-linked, with excessive autophagy
 Myopathy
 Myophosphorylase deficiency
 Myopia
 Myopia, infantile severe
 Myopia, severe

Myor–Myot
 Myorhythmia
 Myositis ossificans post-traumatic
 Myositis ossificans progressiva
 Myositis ossificans
 Myositis, inclusion body
 Myositis
 Myotonia atrophica
 Myotonia mental retardation skeletal anomalies
 Myotubular myopathy

Myx
 Myxedema
 Myxoid liposarcoma
 Myxoma-spotty pigmentation-endocrine overactivity
 Myxomatous peritonitis
 Myxozoa

M